Nereididae (formerly spelled Nereidae) are a family of polychaete worms. It contains about 500 – mostly marine – species grouped into 42 genera. They may be commonly called ragworms or clam worms.

Characteristics
The prostomium of Nereididae bears a pair of palps that are differentiated into two units, the proximal unit is much larger than the distal unit. Parapodia are mostly biramous (only the first two pairs are uniramous). Peristomium fused with the first body segment, with usually two pairs of tentacular cirri. The first body segment with 1-2 pairs tentacular cirri without aciculae.
Compound setae present. Notopodia are distinct (rarely reduced), usually with more flattened lobes, notosetae compound falcigers and/or spinigers (rarely notosetae absent).
They have two prostomial antennae (absent in Micronereis). Their pharynx, when everted, clearly consists of two portions, with a pair of strong jaws on the distal portion and usually with conical teeth on one or more areas of both portions. 
Most genera have no gills (if present, they are usually branched and arise on mid-anterior segments of body). The larval body consists of four segments.

Jaw material
Ragworms' teeth are made of a very tough, yet lightweight material. Unlike bone and tooth enamel, this is not mineralised with calcium, but is formed by a histidine rich protein, with bound zinc ions. Research on this material could lead to applications in engineering.

Systematics
Nereididae are currently considered a monophyletic taxon. Their closest neighbours in polychaete phylogenetic tree are Chrysopetalidae and Hesionidae (the superfamily Nereidoidea).

Nereididae are divided into 42 genera, but the relationships between them are as yet unclear. The family contains traditionally three subfamilies - Namanereidinae, Gymnonereinae and Nereidinae.

Genera

 Alitta
 Australonereis
 Ceratocephale
 Ceratonereis
 Cheilonereis
 Dendronereides
 Eunereis
 Gymnonereis
 Hediste
 Laeonereis
 Leptonereis
 Lycastopsis
 Micronereides
 Namalycastis
 Namanereis
 Neanthes
 Neanthes arenaceodentata
 Nereis
 Nicon
 Olganereis
 Perinereis
 Platynereis
 Rullierinereis
 Sinonereis
 Solomononereis
 Tambalagamia
 Tylonereis
 Tylorrhynchus
 Unanereis
 Websterinereis

Ecology
Ragworms are predominantly marine organisms that may occasionally swim upstream to rivers and even climb to land (for example Lycastopsis catarractarum). They are commonly found in all water depths, foraging in seaweeds, hiding under rocks or burrowing in sand or mud. Ragworms are mainly omnivorous but many are active carnivores. Nereids only breed once before dying (semelparity) and most of them morph into a distinct form to breed (epitoky).

Ragworms are important food sources for a number of shore birds

Human use

Ragworms such as Hediste diversicolor are commonly used as bait in sea angling. They are a popular bait for all types of wrasse and pollock. They are also used as fish feed in aquaculture.

Ragworms, such as Tylorrhynchus heterochaetus, are considered a delicacy in Vietnam where they are used in the dish chả rươi.

In rice-growing areas of China, these worms are called 禾虫 (Mandarin: hé chóng, Cantonese: woh4 chuhng4). They are harvested from the rice fields and are often cooked with eggs.

References

Santos et al., 2006 
A Key to Families of Polychaetes 
The City University of Hong Kong page on Nereidae 
More Information on Nereididae 

Annelid families
Phyllodocida